The 2000 Rugby League World Cup final was the conclusive game of the 2000 Rugby League World Cup tournament and was played between Australia and New Zealand on November 25, 2000 at Old Trafford, Trafford, Greater Manchester, England.

Background

The 2000 Rugby League World Cup was the twelfth staging of the Rugby League World Cup since its inauguration in 1954, and the first since the 1995 tournament. The tournament was held in the United Kingdom, Ireland and France from 28 October, culminating in the final between Australia and New Zealand on 25 November.

Australia

Scores and results list Australia's points tally first.

Australia were undefeated going into the final. Their 110-4 win over Russia set a new world record test match score.

New Zealand

Scores and results list New Zealand's points tally first.

Like Australia, New Zealand were also undefeated going into the Final

Summary
In a high-scoring final at Old Trafford, the Kangaroos overwhelmed their Trans-Tasman opponents. Wendell Sailor scored two tries and Mat Rogers had a near-perfect afternoon with the boot as the Australians ran out 40–12 winners and were crowned world champions for a sixth successive time.

Match details
New Zealand second rower Stephen Kearney became the most capped forward in New Zealand test match history playing in his 36th test.

First half
Australia stepped on the gas from the kick-off, tearing into New Zealand at every opportunity. But the Kiwi defence stood firm, although they almost conceded after 22 minutes. Sailor looked to have scored the first try of the game after a burst down the right wing only for video referee Gerry Kershaw to rule that Stephen Kearney had prevented the Brisbane Broncos player from grounding the ball. The look of disbelief on Sailor's face was there for everyone to see, but he clearly did not let the decision affect his game. Three minutes later, his grubber kick was pounced on by Matt Gidley, who beat Kearney to the touch down. Rogers, assuming the kicking duties in place of the injured Ryan Girdler, landed the conversion to open up a 6–0 lead. New Zealand had few opportunities to go on the offensive, although they finished the first half strongly. But it was the favourites Australia who looked in control and deservedly went into the break in front.

Second half
The start of the second half was held up by the appearance of a male streaker. When play finally got under way, the tackles were just as ferocious as ever, neither side giving an inch. However Australia gained the edge when Brad Fittler split the defence with a pass to Nathan Hindmarsh, who scored from close range, bringing the score to 10–0. Rogers converted to make it 12–0. New Zealand were not about to throw in the towel and hit back almost immediately. Lesley Vainikolo pounced on a loose ball to dive over on 49 minutes, although the decision was again made by the video referee. When Henry Paul landed the conversion, the deficit was back down to six points. Soon after, Australian Halfback, Brett Kimmorley, made a break down the right before feeding the ball inside to fullback Darren Lockyer, who crossed for another try. Rogers' third successful kick made it 18–6 to the defending champions. However, the Kiwis quickly struck back when Tonie Carroll beat several Australian defenders to score. Henry Paul's conversion made it 18–12.

New Zealand then made several crucial errors and Australia were able to capitalise. Sailor grabbed two tries in the space of five minutes to take his tally for the tournament to 10. The first of them came on 63 minutes courtesy of a reverse pass from Gidley. Rogers missed the second of the two quick conversions. Skipper Fittler then breached the New Zealand defence on 73 minutes to score his first try of the final which was converted by Rogers. Substitute Trent Barrett then finished the scoring, with a try that was converted by Rogers.

References

Rugby League World Cup finals
World
Final
World
Sport in Trafford